Datuk Khaidhirah Abu Zahar (born 2 March 1984) is a Malaysian politician, host, director and former actress who has served as Deputy Speaker of the Melaka State Legislative Assembly since December 2021 and Member of the Melaka State Legislative Assembly (MLA) for Rim since November 2021. She is a member of the United Malays National Organisation (UMNO), a component party of the ruling Barisan Nasional (BN) coalition. She is also popularly known by her screen name namely Dira. She is the daughter of the 8th and former Chief Minister of Melaka, Abu Zahar Ithnin.

She is also the first actress to be elected as an elected representative after winning the 2021 Malacca state election.

Early life 
She was born on 2 March 1984 in Merlimau, Malacca, the daughter of the former eighth Chief Minister of Melaka, the late Abu Zahar Ithnin. Dira holds a Bachelor of Laws degree from Universiti Teknologi MARA (UiTM) Shah Alam.

Entertainment career 
Dira has been a host on the television shows Fulus Mania, Jom Ronda with Proton and Melodi. Among the dramas she has acted in include Delima, Cinta Tanpa Suara, Rona Roni Makaroni, Merah Putih, One Hundred Birthdays, Tower 13, Aki Nabalu, Arjuna, Woman, Two Kali Mencintai Mu, Crossings and Aku Bukan Dia. She once starred in the movie My Indie Rock Darling.

Dira was also involved in the theatrical performances of Compilation Vol II (Legacy) and Signs. She is also involved in writing scripts such as for the drama film Syawal Aku Dan Dia on TV Alhijrah. Dira once participated in Sehati Berdansa, a dance reality show published by Astro

She has starred in several films such as For 3 Days, Chow Kit, Kil, The Run (also known as Lari), and Longkai. Dira co -starred with Aiman Hakim Ridza and Emma Maembong in the film Kimchi Untuk Awak directed by Michael Ang, which premiered in March 2017.

Dira took the director's chair by directing the theatrical staging of Mencari Sumaiyah which began its staging at Istana Budaya, Kuala Lumpur from 8 to 14 August 2016.

She also directed sitcom dramas for Astro Warna, 3 Dara Kg.com starring Scha Al-Yahya, Marsha Londoh and Eina Azman.

Political career 
Following in the footsteps of her father, the eighth former Chief Minister of Melaka, Datuk Seri Abu Zahar Haji on Monday ventured into politics, Dira joined Puteri UMNO by serving as Exco from 2015 to 2018. Her appointment was made during the UMNO wing meeting at Menara Dato 'Onn chaired by the Chief Puteri, Datuk Mas Ermieyati Samsudin who is also the Deputy Minister of Tourism and Culture. Also present, her Deputy, Zahida Zarik Khan; Puteri's Assistant Secretary, Fahariyah Md Nordin and the EXCO line -up

On 24 August 2013, Dira submitted the Puteri UMNO membership form to the state UMNO Liaison Committee Chairman, Datuk Idris Haron. She was quoted from Utusan Malaysia as saying: "I want to do many things for the party because I see how my mother and father struggle in the party and for their spirit I feel called to join Puteri".

Dira revealed to Utusan Malaysia in June 2018 that she made an official statement regarding speculation that she was contesting for the post of UMNO Puteri Chief. In an interview with Sinar Harian, Dira stated that she remained loyal to UMNO, saying that what she was doing now was business and politics and no longer acting. Dira was announced as the Jasin Division UMNO Puteri Chief at the movement's delegate meeting. She won unopposed for the post for the 2018-2021 term.

Dira was one of the new faces picked by the party as the BN candidate to contest the 2021 Malacca state election for the Rim seat. She became the first artiste to successfully win an election to be a lawmaker. On 27 December 2021, she was appointed as Deputy Speaker of the Melaka State Legislative Assembly along with new Speaker Ibrahim Durum by Chief Minister Sulaiman Md Ali.

Personal life 
Dira has been married three times. She was married to musician Tengku Shafiz-Rullah Tengku Mohd Shahid (now married to Sherie Merlis) in 2006, and separated in 2010. They have a daughter named Tengku Anggun Deandra Tengku Shafiz-Rullah. Dira married the cameraman and director, Helmi Yusof on November 14, 2011, and had a miscarriage in December 2013. The couple filed for divorce in 2016.

She has an adopted child named Waris Iskandar Andiqa after getting an application from the government.

Dira married for the third time with businessman Syfik Izdzywan Sidek on 21 June 2020 at the Al Azim Mosque, Melaka, at 10.30 am. During the ceremony, Dira received a dowry of RM1,000 along with three delivery trays for five.

She has a hobby of riding high-powered motorcycles.

Controversy 
In April 2012, Dira became the subject of controversy when she was allegedly involved in a fight case and was accused of having caused grievous bodily harm to a woman following a slight misunderstanding. She lodged a police report on the incident, but denied involvement in the incident. As a result, she was rested as the host of Melodi and was not even allowed to attend the promotion of her film Chow Kit.

Filmography

Film

Drama

Theater

Telemovie

Television

Election Results

Honours and awards

Honours of Malaysia 
  :
  Companion Class II of the Exalted Order of Malacca (DPSM) – Datuk (2020)

References

External links 
 
 
 

1984 births
Living people
People from Malacca
Malaysian people of Malay descent
Malaysian Muslims
Malaysian film actors
Malaysian television actors
Malaysian actresses
Malaysian actor-politicians
United Malays National Organisation politicians
21st-century Malaysian actresses
21st-century Malaysian politicians
Members of the Malacca State Legislative Assembly
Women MLAs in Malacca
21st-century Malaysian women politicians